Bijoy Barman (born 1 December 1928) is an Indian former swimmer. He competed in the men's 100 metre backstroke and the water polo tournament at the 1952 Summer Olympics.

References

External links
 

1928 births
Possibly living people
Indian male swimmers
Indian male water polo players
Olympic swimmers of India
Olympic water polo players of India
Swimmers at the 1952 Summer Olympics
Water polo players at the 1952 Summer Olympics
Place of birth missing (living people)
Male backstroke swimmers
20th-century Indian people